The Conservative Party was a conservative political party in Iceland between 1924 and 1929.

History
The party was established in 1924 by a majority of the members of the Citizens' Party. It won the 1926 Upper House elections and the 1927 parliamentary elections, in which it received 42.% of the vote.

In 1929 it merged with the Liberal Party to form the Independence Party.

Ideology
The party supported the full independence of Iceland and separation from the Danish crown.

References

Defunct political parties in Iceland
Political parties established in 1924
Political parties disestablished in 1929
1924 establishments in Iceland
1929 disestablishments in Iceland
Conservative parties in Iceland
Independence Party (Iceland)